is a Japanese footballer currently playing as a forward for Avispa Fukuoka.

Career statistics

Club
.

Notes

References

External links

Profile at Avispa Fukuoka

1997 births
Living people
Association football people from Kumamoto Prefecture
Chukyo University alumni
Japanese footballers
Association football forwards
J2 League players
J3 League players
Avispa Fukuoka players
FC Imabari players